The Book of Pastoral Rule (Latin: Liber Regulae Pastoralis, Regula Pastoralis or Cura Pastoralis — sometimes translated into English Pastoral Care) is a treatise on the responsibilities of the clergy written by Pope Gregory I around the year 590, shortly after his papal inauguration.  It became one of the most influential works on the topic ever written. The title was that used by Gregory when sending a copy to his friend Leander of Seville. The text was addressed to John, the bishop of Ravenna, as a response to a query from him.  Gregory later revised the text somewhat.

Description
The personal, intellectual and moral standards Gregory enjoined parish priests to possess, though noble, were considered in certain quarters to be unrealistic given the limitations imposed by 6th century realities. For example, one letter from the Bishop of Cartagena (Book II, letter 54 in Gregory's collected correspondence) praises the book, but expresses a reserve that it might prove beyond ordinary capacities.

The influence of the book, however, was vast. After reading the Regulae, the Byzantine Emperor Maurice directed that it be translated and distributed to every bishop within the empire (Demacopoulos). Indeed, among the works of all the Latin authors in the patristic period, Gregory's alone were translated into Greek during his own lifetime.

In the West, the book also retained its significance and broad dissemination.

That the book had been taken to England by Augustine of Canterbury— who was sent to the Kingdom of Kent by Gregory in 597— was noted in the preface to it written by Alfred the Great, who in the late 9th century translated it into Old English as part of a project to improve education in Anglo-Saxon England.  In addition to details of his translation methodology, the extensive preface describes the rationale and intentions behind the project: even hundreds of years after it was written, the work was still seen as the most essential guide for pastors, and Alfred wished every bishop in his kingdom to have a copy for the benefit of the less-educated clergy.

Alfred the Great's translation is kept at the Bodleian Library, Oxford, and is the oldest surviving book written in English. In May 2011, it was inscribed in UNESCO's UK Memory of the World Register.

Beyond England, Gregory's Regulae was recommended to Charlemagne's bishops at a series of councils held in 813, and a letter of Hincmar, Archbishop of Rheims  845–882, notes that a copy of it, together with the Book of Canons, was given into the hands of bishops before the altar at their consecration (Schaff).

Among the numerous manuscripts of these widely read Regulae, perhaps the oldest is Troyes, Bibliothèque Municipale, MS 504; it is an early seventh-century manuscript in an uncial script without divisions between words, probably originating in Rome. There are about twenty-five long lines per page. The only ornamentation in the manuscript consists of penwork initials in red, green and yellow (above). It contains the full revised text.

Notes

References
Philip Schaff, Nicene and Post-Nicene Fathers ser. 2, vol XII (Christian Classics Ethereal Library): The Book of Pastoral Rule: preface
George Demacopoulos (trans.), St. Gregory the Great: Book of Pastoral Rule, Popular Patristic Texts Series (Crestwood, NY:  St. Vladimir's Seminary Press, 2007).

External links 
Public domain English translation: Philip Schaff, Nicene and Post-Nicene Fathers ser. 2, vol XII, The Book of Pastoral Rule (New York, 1895). Available on CCEL and archive.org
Extracts from Online Reference Book for Medieval Studies
Public domain audiobook of the Barmby translation from Nicene and Post-Nicene Fathers
Latin text of Regulae Pastoralis
Alfred the Great's Old English translation of Gregory the Great's Pastoral Care (MS Ii.2.4), an 11th-century copy fully digitised in Cambridge Digital Library
King Alfred's West-Saxon version of Gregory's Pastoral care, Hatton and Cotton Manuscripts. Edited and translated to modern English by Henry Sweet, published in 1871

6th-century Christian texts
Works by Pope Gregory I
6th-century Latin books
590s
Bodleian Library collection